Sajadah Cinta Maryam is an Indonesian soap opera musical comedy drama produced by Screenplay Productions that airs daily on SCTV.

Synopsis 
Who says girls can not defend themselves, let alone defend their own! Maryam (Michelle Ziudith), nephew only Uwan Sabeni Jawara Silat Setu village, is a whiz at village, bravely faces Ali (Irysyadillah), complex guy and gank'nya, just because Ali bullies her friend Maryam.

Serial drama "Sajadah Cinta Maryam" is a comedy drama about the religious nuances love and sacrifice.

The series began Monday 11 May 2015.

Cast 
 Michelle Ziudith
 Rizky Nazar
 Irsyadillah
 Mathias Muchus
 Ira Wibowo
 Amara
 Ali Zainal
 Varissa Camela
 Lionil Hendrik
 Raslina Rasyidin
 Rahman Yacob
 Beddu Tohar
 Augie Fantinus
 Aiko Sarwosri Isra
 Windy Lay

References

External links 
  Synopsis Sajadah Cinta Maryam at Website channel SCTV

2015 Indonesian television series debuts
Indonesian drama television series
Indonesian television soap operas
Indonesian comedy television series
Musical television soap operas
2010s Indonesian television series
2010s television soap operas